Ismaël Ankobo (born October 13, 1997 in Ouenzé) is a Congolese football player who is currently plays for CARA.

He was part of the Congo squad that is participated in the qualification of the 2018 World Cup.

References

External links

1997 births
Living people
Republic of the Congo footballers
Republic of the Congo international footballers
Association football forwards
AS Kondzo players
Ittihad Tanger players
AS FAR (football) players
CARA Brazzaville players
Botola players
Republic of the Congo expatriate footballers
Republic of the Congo expatriate sportspeople in Morocco
Expatriate footballers in Morocco
Sportspeople from Brazzaville